Mikhail Sobolev (8 September 1937 – 12 November 2021) was a Russian diplomat. He served as Ambassador of the Soviet Union and later Russia to Guyana and Trinidad and Tobago from 1989 to 1995.

References

1937 births
2021 deaths
Soviet diplomats
Russian diplomats
Ambassadors of the Soviet Union to Guyana
Ambassadors of the Soviet Union to Trinidad and Tobago
Ambassadors of Russia to Guyana
Ambassadors of Russia to Trinidad and Tobago